Stefko Konstantinov Velichkov (born 15 August 1949) is a former Bulgarian football defender who played for Bulgaria at the 1974 FIFA World Cup. He also played for Spartak Pleven, Akademik Svishtov, Etar Veliko Tarnovo and CSKA Sofia.

Honours

Club
CSKA Sofia
 Bulgarian A Group (2): 1974–75, 1975–76

References

External links
FIFA profile

1949 births
Living people
Bulgarian footballers
Bulgaria international footballers
PFC Spartak Pleven players
PFC Akademik Svishtov players
FC Etar Veliko Tarnovo players
PFC CSKA Sofia players
First Professional Football League (Bulgaria) players
Association football defenders
1974 FIFA World Cup players
Bulgarian football managers
Sportspeople from Pleven
OFC Spartak Pleven managers